73rd meridian may refer to:

73rd meridian east, a line of longitude east of the Greenwich Meridian
73rd meridian west, a line of longitude west of the Greenwich Meridian